The Hefei Olympic Sports Centre Stadium is a football stadium in Hefei, China. It used to host the China League Two side Anhui Litian. The stadium has a capacity of 60,000.

International matches

References

Football venues in China
Athletics (track and field) venues in China
Sports venues in Anhui